Ronald Maxwell Hall (11 November 1945 – 26 June 2014) was an Australian rules footballer who played in Tasmania during the 1960s and 1970s and represented the state a number of times including matches at the 1969 Adelaide Carnival.

Hall played senior football with Scottsdale in the Northern Tasmanian Football Association. He was a member of six NTFA premiership teams for that club (1964, 1965, 1968, 1970, 1971, 1973) and also played in two sides that were runners-up (1966 & 1974). He was placed a number of times in the club Best and Fairest, finishing second in 1967, and third in 1969, 1974 and 1978.

Ron Hall was inducted as a member of the Tasmanian Football Hall of Fame in 2008.

References

1945 births
2014 deaths
Scottsdale Football Club players
Australian rules footballers from Tasmania
Tasmanian Football Hall of Fame inductees